The Third Socialist Workers' Congress of France was held in Marseille, France, in 1879. At this congress the socialist leaders rejected both cooperation and anarchism, both of which would allow the existing regime to continue, and adopted a program based on collectivism. The congress also adopted a motion that women should have equal rights to men, but several delegates felt that essentially woman's place was in the home. The congress has been called a triumph of Guesdism and the birthplace of French Marxist socialism, but both claims are open to question.
The attendees soon split into rival groups with disparate beliefs.

Location

The Third Socialist Workers' Congress was held in Marseille on 20–31 October 1879.
It was held in the Salle des Folies-Bergères.
The Marseilles Congress followed the Congress of Lyon of 1878, and was the most important socialist congress in France before 1889 in terms of attendance, resolutions and its effect on the socialist party's constitution.
The congress was followed by the 1880 Congress of Le Havre.

Collectivism

Jules Guesde was a former anarchist who had converted to Marxism in 1876.
Guesde was sick and bedridden in Paris at the time of the congress, but was represented by two jewelry workers, Jean Lombard of Marseille and Eugène Fournière of Paris.
A motion composed by Guesde was moved by the delegates from Paris and carried by a large majority.
It was:

The congress adopted a Marxist program and supported collectivism by 73 votes to 27.
The collectivists rejected efforts to found cooperatives as being petty bourgeois and covert capitalism.
The delegates were also opposed to cooperation and to anarchism, both of which left the status quo undisturbed, and declared themselves in favor of political action.
The congress has been described as a triumph of Guesdism, but in fact was a triumph of collectivism, which Guesde's opponents Paul Brousse and Benoît Malon also supported.

Foundation of the Socialist Party

The suppression of the Paris Commune in 1871 was a severe blow to socialism in France, and for several years afterwards workers were reluctant to get involved in politics.
At the congresses of Paris (1876), Lyon (1878) and Marseille (1879) only working men could speak and vote, and discussion of politics was banned.
However Guesde wanted to organize a political party.
He claimed that unlike conventional parties the new party would serve the interests of the workers rather than the ambitions of the party leaders.
The congress decided that the proletariat should separate itself from all the bourgeois parties and form a new party.
At first the party represented artisans such as hatters and shoemakers, but not weavers, miners or foundry workers.
The new party had to compete for the attention of the workers with the Blanquists, the Anarchists, after 1881 with the Possiblists, and after 1890 with the Allemanists.

Although the launch of the Parti Ouvrier (Party of Labour) by the 1879 congress has been treated by socialist and communist historians as the date when Marxist socialism was born in France, the new "party" was a loosely defined movement dominated by anti-political anarchists and anti-socialist radicals, with few members with recognizably Marxist views. It was only between the congress and the 1882 split that Guesde and Lafargue developed hardline Marxist positions.
The party suffered from internal disagreements from the start.
Anarchists such as Jean Grave disliked political involvement of any type, while Brousse was suspicious of Guesde's Marxist authoritarianism and thought the nationalization program would lead to a socialist dictatorship.

Women's rights 

Some of the delegates defended the concept of the family wage, and argued against women's wage labour.
One delegate said "woman's place is in the home, where so many daily concerns call her, and not in a factory or workshop ... The young girl should never learn any trade except those which, later, when she has become a wife and a mother, she can carry out in the home."
Isidore Finance, who represented the building painters of Paris, urged "tough-fisted and hardheaded workingmen ... to demand a wage that is not simply the equivalent to the product of their labours, but sufficient to keep women and the aged at home."

Hubertine Auclert made passionate pleas for women's rights, but argued that they needed economic independence due to their "natural" motherhood.
Auclert was on a special committee to consider the equality of women, and was given an hour to speak to the congress on this subject.
After her speech she was invited to head a committee to prepare a statement on women's rights.
This statement, which said women should have the same social, legal, political and working rights as men was approved by the congress.

Notes

Citations

Sources

History of socialism
Political congresses
1879 in politics
1870s conferences
1879 in France